Northern Viking is an annual NATO exercise held in Iceland. The exercises were held biennially until 2006 when the frequency was increased.
The purpose of the exercise is to test the capabilities of Iceland and its NATO allies, as well as increase the readiness of the forces involved and their inter-operability.

Northern Viking 2022 
Several NATO member states participated in the exercises in 2022. The United States Navy, in a press release, described 2022's exercise as "a hunt for adversary submarines" and "visit, board, search and seizure missions on suspect vessels."

Participants 

 
 ICGV Þór
 
 USS Arlington
 CH-53E Sea Stallions
 22nd Marine Expeditionary Unit
 USS Kearsarge
 
 FS Latouche-Tréville
 
 HNoMS Thor Heyerdahl
 
 FGS Sachsen
 
 Royal Marine Commandos

Northern Viking 2011
Northern Viking 2011 was held by the Icelandic Coast Guard and the United States Air Forces in Europe (USAFE). Among the training exercises were transport of troops to and from Iceland and air defence. The exercise also tested cooperation of naval and air assets in view of increasing importance arctic operations.

Participants

 ICG: 3 offshore patrol vessels 
 USAF: F-16 fighters, 3 KC-135 air-refueling planes
 RNoAF: F-16 fighters
 AM: Eurofighter Typhoon fighters
 RDN: 1 Thetis-class patrol vessel, 1 Lynx helicopter

Northern Viking 2008
Northern Viking 2008 was held by the Icelandic Defence Agency and the United States European Command (EUCOM). More than 400 foreign troops were deployed to Icelandic bases with aircraft and a Danish warship.

Participants

Operations

The exercise consisted of an air defence exercise and a maritime defence exercise.

Air defence exercise

 ICG: 2 SAR-helicopters 
 USAF: 4 fighters, 3 KC-135 air-refueling planes
 RNoAF: 5 F-16 fighters
 RCAF: 6 CF-18 fighters
 NATO: 2 E-3 AWACS planes

Maritime defence exercise

 ICG: 1 Ægir-class offshore patrol vessel, 1 helicopter 
 RDN: 1 Thetis-class patrol vessel
 USN: 2 P-3 Orion ASW aircraft

Northern Viking 2007
Northern Viking 2007 was held by the Icelandic MFA Office of Defence and the United States European Command (EUCOM). More than 240 foreign troops were deployed to Icelandic bases with aircraft and a Danish warship.

Participants

Operations

The exercise consisted of an air defence exercise and an anti-terrorist exercise.

Air defence exercise

 ICG: 2 SAR-helicopters 
 USAF: 3 F-15 fighters, 2 KC-135 air-refueling planes
 RDN: 1 Thetis-class frigate
 RNoAF: 2 F-16 fighters, 1 P-3 Orion ASW aircraft
 NATO: 2 E-3 AWACS planes

Anti-terrorist exercise

: 15 Víkingasveitin troops, 1 helicopter
: 6 Jægerkorpset troops, 1 helicopter
: 16 Latvian Special Tasks Unit troops
: 20 Forsvarets Spesialkommando (FSK) troops

References

Varnaræfingin Norður Víkingur 2008
Varnaræfingin Norður Víkingur 07

NATO military exercises
Defence of Iceland
2007 in Iceland
2008 in Iceland